The following table indicates the party of elected officials in the U.S. state of Hawaii:
Governor
Lieutenant Governor

The table also indicates the historical party composition in the:
State Senate
State House of Representatives
State delegation to the U.S. Senate
State delegation to the U.S. House of Representatives

For years in which a presidential election was held, the table indicates which party's nominees received the state's electoral votes.

The parties are as follows: 
 (HR)
 (D)
Independent (Kuoka) (IK)
 (Lu)
 (NL)
 (N)
 (NR)
Queen Emma Party (Q)
 (R)
 (W)
No Party (NP)

Kingdom of Hawaii

Republic of Hawaii

Territory of Hawaii

State of Hawaii

See also
Law and government in Hawaii
Politics of Hawaii
Elections in Hawaii
Government of Hawaii

References

Politics of Hawaii
Government of Hawaii
 
Hawaii